Walter Olivera (born 16 August 1952) is a Uruguayan footballer. He played in ten matches for the Uruguay national football team from 1973 to 1983. He was also part of Uruguay's squad for the 1975 Copa América tournament.

References

External links
 

1953 births
Living people
Uruguayan footballers
Uruguay international footballers
Place of birth missing (living people)
Association football defenders
Peñarol players
Clube Atlético Mineiro players
Uruguayan expatriate footballers
Expatriate footballers in Brazil
Uruguayan football managers
Peñarol managers
Rampla Juniors managers